Santa Elena, named after Helena of Constantinople, is a district of the Cordillera Department, Paraguay.

Districts of Cordillera Department